Elfed Morris (9 June 1942 – 4 November 2013) was a Welsh professional footballer. He played in the English Football League for Wrexham, Chester and Halifax Town.

Playing career
The nephew of former Wrexham manager Billy Morris, Elfed joined Wrexham in May 1960 after starting out with his hometown club of Colwyn Bay. Two years later he moved to local rivals Chester, where he was to spend the majority of his professional career.

Morris scored 69 league goals over the next six years, leaving him as the club's fourth highest Football League scorer in their history. 24 of them came in 1964–65, when Morris and fellow attackers Jimmy Humes, Mike Metcalf, Hugh Ryden and Gary Talbot all managed at least 20 goals each in league and English cup matches. Morris scored an identical tally the following season, amid rumours he would be leaving for a bigger club.

Morris ended his league career at Halifax Town, before spending time in non-league football with Caernarfon Town, Bethesda Athletic, Llandudno Borough and Colwyn Bay. He managed both Caernarfon and Colwyn Bay before becoming club groundsman with the Bay,. Morris died on 4 November 2013.

Away from football, Morris became a successful insurance agent in the Colwyn Bay Area and afterwards ran his own entertainment agency in Colwyn Bay.

References

Bibliography

External links
 

1942 births
People from Colwyn Bay
Sportspeople from Conwy County Borough
Welsh footballers
Welsh football managers
English Football League players
Association football wingers
Wrexham A.F.C. players
Chester City F.C. players
Halifax Town A.F.C. players
Caernarfon Town F.C. players
Bethesda Athletic F.C. players
Colwyn Bay F.C. players
Caernarfon Town F.C. managers
Colwyn Bay F.C. managers
2013 deaths